Micrallecto is a genus of crustaceans belonging to the monotypic family Micrallectidae.

Species:

Micrallecto fusii 
Micrallecto uncinata

References

Cyclopoida